Graeme or Graham Campbell may refer to:

Graeme Campbell (director) (born 1954), Canadian film director
Graeme Campbell (politician) (born 1939), Australian politician
Graham Campbell (1936–2022), Australian rules footballer
Graham Campbell (chef)

See also

James Graham-Campbell